Galeazzo Maria Sforza (24 January 1444 – 26 December 1476) was the fifth Duke of Milan from 1466 until his assassination a decade later.  He was notorious for being lustful, cruel, and tyrannical.

He was born to Francesco Sforza, a popular condottiero and ally of Cosimo de' Medici who would gain the Duchy of Milan in 1450, and Bianca Maria Visconti.  He married into the Gonzaga family; on the death of his first wife Dorotea Gonzaga, he married Bona of Savoy. Cruel and vengeful, he was "a man who did great follies and dishonest things not to write."

Life
Galeazzo Maria Sforza  was born in Fermo, near the family's castle of Girifalco, the first son of Francesco Sforza and Bianca Maria Visconti. At the death of his father (8 March 1466), Galeazzo was in France at the head of a military expedition to help King Louis XI of France against Charles I of Burgundy. Called back home by his mother, Galeazzo returned to Italy by an adventurous trip under a false name. The false identity was necessary as he had to pass by the territories of the family enemy, the Duke of Savoy, who made an unsuccessful attempt on Galeazzo's life. He entered Milan on 20 March, acclaimed by the populace.

In his first years Galeazzo and his mother ruled jointly, but later his ruthless character pushed him to oust Bianca Maria from Milan.

Patronage
Sforza was famous as a patron of music.  Under his direction, financial backing and encouragement, his chapel grew into one of the most famous and historically significant musical ensembles in Europe.  Composers from the north, especially the Franco-Flemish composers from the present-day Low Countries, came to sing in his chapel and write masses, motets and secular music for him. Some of the figures associated with the Sforza chapel include Alexander Agricola, Johannes Martini, Loyset Compère, and Gaspar van Weerbeke.  However, most of the singers at the Sforza chapel fled after Galeazzo's murder and took positions elsewhere; as a result, there was soon a rise in musical standards in other cities such as Ferrara.

Reputation
Galeazzo Sforza is also known to have had a cruel streak. Bernardino Corio describes him as cruel: he tells him capable of torturing even his friends to the point of madness, as he did with Giovanni Veronese, his favorite, to whom he cut off a testicle. The twenty-two-year-old Ambrogio instead, in order to escape his flattery (Galeazzo was in fact bisexual), castrated himself. He had the young Pietro Drego buried alive and out of jealousy he had both hands amputated by Pietrino da Castello, slandering him as a forger, since he had caught him conversing with his mistress. When he surprised a farmer who had caught a hare against the hunting ban, he forced him to swallow it whole with all his skin until he suffocated. Since an astrologer priest had predicted the date of his death, Galeazzo had him walled up alive and wanted to see him starve. He had the habit of raping both men and women, and of appropriating the wives of others, and even worse, once he had finished, he had them raped in turn by his favorites, reason that was the basis of the conspiracy that crushed him in 1476. The lightest punishment of all went instead to his barber, the Travaglino, who, having cut it by mistake, received four lashes. The Corio also describes him as greedy, and imposer of unusual taxes. 

When, in 1471, his sister Ippolyta asked a Franciscan friar holy man in Naples - perhaps Giovanni della Marca - to pray for Galeazzo Maria, the friar refused to do so, saying: ""What do you want, madonna, that I pray to God for the Lord your brother, who fears God as much as that wall does?""

Assassination

There were three principal assassins involved in Sforza's death: Carlo Visconti, Gerolamo Olgiati, and Giovanni Andrea Lampugnani, all fairly high-ranking officials at the Milanese court.

Lampugnani, descended from Milanese nobility, is recognized as the leader of the conspiracy. His motives were based primarily on a land dispute, in which Galeazzo had failed to intervene in a matter which saw the Lampugnani family lose considerable properties.  Visconti and Olgiati also bore the duke enmity - Olgiati was a Republican idealist, whereas Visconti believed Sforza to have taken his sister's virginity.

After carefully studying Sforza's movements, the conspirators made their move on the day after Christmas, 1476, feast day of Saint Stephen, patron saint of Santo Stefano, the church where the deed was to be committed.  Supported by about thirty friends, the three men waited in the church for the duke to arrive for mass.  When Galeazzo Sforza arrived, Lampugnani knelt before him; after some words were exchanged, Lampugnani rose suddenly and stabbed Sforza in the groin and breast.  Olgiati and Visconti soon joined in, as did a servant of Lampugnani's.

Sforza was dead within a matter of seconds. All the assassins quickly escaped in the ensuing mayhem save for Lampugnani, who became entangled in some of the church's cloth and was killed by a guard. His body soon fell into the hands of a mob, which dragged the corpse through the streets, slashing and beating at it; finally, they hung the body upside-down outside Lampugnani's house.  The beheaded corpse was cut down the next day and, in an act of symbolism, the "sinning" right hand was removed, burnt, and put on display.

Aftermath of the assassination
Despite the initial public reaction, the government brought swift justice, soon encouraged by the public as well.

The conspirators had given little thought to the repercussions of their crime, and were apprehended within days.  Visconti and Olgiati were soon found and executed, as was the servant of Lampugnani who had participated in the slaying. The executions took place in a public ceremony that culminated in the display of their corpses as a warning to others.

Evidence from the conspirators' confessions indicated that the assassins had been encouraged by the humanist Cola Montano, who had left Milan some months before, and who bore malice against the duke for a public whipping some years before.  While being tortured, Olgiati also uttered the famous words, "Mors acerba, fama perpetua, stabit vetus memoria facti" (Death is bitter, but glory is eternal, the memory of my deed will endure).

Similar elements indicate that this assassination was likely influential in the Pazzi conspiracy, a subsequent attempt to dethrone the Medici family in Florence and to replace them with Girolamo Riario.

Children
With his second wife, Bona of Savoy, Sforza had four children:
 Gian Galeazzo Sforza (1469–1494), who became duke upon his father's death; he married his cousin Isabella of Aragon, Duchess of Milan and had issue
 Hermes Maria Sforza (1470–1503), Marquis of Tortona
 Bianca Maria Sforza (1472–1510), who married Philibert I, Duke of Savoy and Maximilian I, Holy Roman Emperor
 Anna Sforza (1476–1497), who married Alfonso I d'Este

With his mistress Lucrezia Landriani, he had several illegitimate children:

 Carlo (born 1461), his granddaughter, Violante Bentivoglio (1505–1550), married Giovanni Paolo I Sforza, who was the legitimized son of Ludovico il Moro, duke of Milan, and Lucrezia Crivelli.
 Caterina Sforza, (1462-1509) who married 3 times: Girolamo Riario; Giacomo Feo; and Giovanni de' Medici il Popolano
 2 more children

By his mistress Lucia Marliani
 Ottaviano Maria Sforza (1475-1548) Bishop of Lodi

Other children by unknown women, including
 Chiara, who married Count Pietro dal Verme in 1480

References

Sources
 
 Belotti Bortolo. Il Dramma di Gerolamo Olgiati; Milano; 1929

External links
Biographical notes to Galazzo Maria Sforza

1444 births
1476 deaths
Medieval murder victims
People from Fermo
Assassinated Italian people
Galeazzo Maria Sforza
Galeazzo Maria Sforza
15th-century Italian nobility
Burials at Milan Cathedral
Assassinated heads of state